China–Lithuanian relations are the bilateral foreign relations between the People's Republic of China (China) and Lithuania. The PRC has a chargé d'affaires in Vilnius. In December 2021, Lithuania closed its embassy in Beijing.

Timeline 
China-Lithuanian relations date back to 1921, when the Republic of China recognized independent Lithuania until the latter's occupation and subsequent annexation by the Soviet Union in 1940. Modern diplomatic relations between Lithuania and the People's Republic of China were officially established on 14 September 1991, following the official restoration of Lithuanian independence. Neither the PRC nor the ROC recognized the incorporation of Lithuania into the Soviet Union.

In 1992, the PRC's embassy was established in Vilnius, and in 1995, the Lithuanian embassy was established in Beijing.

In August 2021, the ROC opened its representative office in Vilnius under the name of "Taiwanese" (the first under this name in Europe), with the Lithuanian office in Taipei to open by the end of 2021. In the opinion of the Chinese government, Lithuania has thus reneged on its 1991 agreement with PRC on the establishment of diplomatic relations where Lithuania recognized the One China principle; Lithuanian government does not consider being in breach of the agreement. In response, the PRC recalled its ambassador in Vilnius, Shen Zhifei, and demanded that Lithuania recall its ambassador in Beijing, Diana Mickevičienė. Trade between the two countries were also seriously disrupted. Relations between the PRC and Lithuania were downgraded to the level of chargé d'affaires on 21 November 2021.

On 3 December 2021, Lithuania reported that in an escalation of the diplomatic spat over relations with Taiwan, China had stopped all imports from the Baltic state. It said Beijing has delisted Lithuania as a country of origin, preventing items from clearing customs, and was rejecting all import applications. As a result of the conflict, China pressured Continental AG and other international companies to stop doing business with Lithuania. The spat spilled over to the rest of the EU when China banned the import of goods which contained Lithuanian parts potentially disrupting integrated supply chains in the common market. EU Ambassador to China Nicolas Chapuis supported Lithuania and attempted to intervene on their behalf. The president of the EU Chamber of Commerce in China described the Chinese government's move as "unprecedented."
In early 2022, reports emerged that German Chamber of Commerce warned Lithuania that German-owned factories will be closed if relations with China are not improved.

Lithuanian President Gitanas Nauseda said in a radio interview in January 2022 that he thought it was a mistake to allow Taiwan to open a representative office using the name 'Taiwan' in Vilnius. These remarks were subsequently widely published across mainland Chinese media that reported Lithuania had admitted its mistake. Chinese foreign ministry spokesman Wang Wenbin said "Recognizing the mistake is a correct step, but what is more important is to take action, correct the 'One China, One Taiwan' mistaken act, and return to the principle of One China." However, political analysts quoted on the BBC claimed that Nauseda was not suggesting to make any significant change to Lithuanian policy regarding the opening of the office and improving relations with Taiwan, only that he thought it had caused an avoidable diplomatic crisis by using the name "Taiwan" rather than "Taipei" or something else as the name for the office in Vilnius.

An independent 2022 poll commissioned by the Lithuanian Ministry of Foreign Affairs showed that the Lithuanian population overwhelmingly opposes the government's policies towards China. Only 13% of Lithuanians view the policies positively. Following the poll results, opposition parties have called on the government to respect popular opinion and repair ties with Beijing. Foreign Minister Gabrielius Landsbergis claimed that the survey question was not worded accurately enough, stating: "Lithuania has de facto never changed its policy on China. China has decided to apply unannounced, most likely illegal measures against Lithuania and the European Union. [...] I would probably ask whether Lithuania should support, agree with the aspiration of Taiwan's people to be called Taiwanese, instead of asking about Lithuania's policy on China." China's acting chargé d'affairs in Lithuania, Qu Baihua, responded by saying that unsanctioned visits by Lithuanian government officials that include agreements with sovereignty implications violate the One China policy that Lithuania agreed to.

Human rights criticisms
In June 2020, Lithuania openly opposed the Hong Kong national security law in a statement given at the United Nations Human Rights Council. Later, in May 2021, the Seimas passed a resolution that recognized the Uyghur genocide and called for the PRC's government to revoke the Hong Kong national security law.

In March 2021, the PRC blacklisted Lithuanian MP  because of her comments regarding the state of human rights in mainland China.

On 19 November 2021, group of members of Lithuanian national parliament (Seimas) released an official letter encouraging Lithuania to withdraw from the 2022 Winter Olympics due to human rights violations in China. Daina Gudzinevičiūtė, president of National Olympic Committee of Lithuania, released a statement stating that the Olympic games should be politically neutral and confirmed that committee has no plans to boycott the games.

Notable ambassadors
 Chen Di (1992–1993)

See also
Foreign relations of the People's Republic of China
Foreign relations of the Republic of China
Foreign relations of Lithuania
Lithuania–Taiwan relations

References

External links
 Embassy of the Republic of Lithuania in Beijing

 
Bilateral relations of Lithuania
Lituania